Psoloessa is a genus of slant-faced grasshoppers in the family Acrididae. There are at least four described species in Psoloessa.

Species
These four species belong to the genus Psoloessa:
 Psoloessa brachyptera (Bruner, 1905)
 Psoloessa delicatula (Scudder, 1876) (brown-spotted range grasshopper)
 Psoloessa microptera Otte, 1979
 Psoloessa texana Scudder, 1875 (Texas spotted range grasshopper)

References

Further reading

 
 
 

Acrididae genera
Articles created by Qbugbot
Gomphocerinae